San Isidro is a municipality in the Honduran department of Intibucá.

Demographics
At the time of the 2013 Honduras census, San Isidro municipality had a population of 4,387. Of these, 91.18% were Indigenous (90.77% Lenca), 7.20% Mestizo, 1.32% White and 0.30% Black or Afro-Honduran.

References

Municipalities of the Intibucá Department